If Marriage Fails is a 1925 American silent drama film directed by John Ince and written by C. Gardner Sullivan.

Plot
As described in a film magazine review, Eleanor prefers the company of the unpopular Gene Deering to that of her wealthy husband, Joe Woodbury, who has fallen in love with the fortune teller Nadia. Becoming jealous, Eleanor tells Nadia that she is about to become a mother, and Nadia promises that she will not see Joe again. Eleanor and Deering are picked up following a roadhouse raid by Nadia and Dr. Mallini, who attends Eleanor when she is slightly injured. The doctor tells Nadia that Eleanor has lied about any approaching motherhood. Joe learns of the roadhouse affair, divorces Eleanor, and wins Nadia as a wife.

Cast

Preservation
With no prints of If Marriage Fails located in any film archives, it is a lost film.

References

External links

1925 films
American black-and-white films
American silent feature films
1925 drama films
Silent American drama films
Lost American films
Film Booking Offices of America films
1925 lost films
Lost drama films
1920s American films